Ahmadabad (also Romanized as Aḩmadābād) is a village in Khondab Rural District, in the Central District of Khondab County, Markazi Province, Iran. At the 2006 census, its population was 16, in 4 families.

References 

Populated places in Khondab County